William Neil Goodwin (born 7 May 2002) is an English professional footballer who plays as a forward for Cheltenham Town.

Career
Goodwin began his career with Chester at the age of 9, making his first-team debut in January 2020 aged 17. He moved on loan to Stalybridge Celtic in October 2020.

He signed for Stoke City in February 2021, having previously been a child mascot for the club, moving on loan to Hartlepool United in August 2021. He made his professional debut on 14 August 2021 against Barrow, scoring in a 3–2 defeat.

In July 2022, Goodwin joined National League side Torquay United on a six-month loan.

On 9 January 2023, Goodwin signed for League One side Cheltenham Town on a two-and-a-half year deal.

Career statistics

References

2002 births
Living people
English footballers
Chester F.C. players
Stalybridge Celtic F.C. players
Stoke City F.C. players
Hartlepool United F.C. players
Torquay United F.C. players
Cheltenham Town F.C. players
Association football forwards
English Football League players
National League (English football) players
Northern Premier League players